Shahr-e Bozorg is a village and the district capital of Shahri Buzurg District, in Badakhshan Province in north-eastern Afghanistan.
 

During May 1998 this village was at the epicentre of a large earthquake.  Support was provided by helicopter and donkey convoy due to the inaccessibility of the area.  Medical and emergency food support was provided by a consortium of the Northern Alliance Government and International NGOs assisted by UNOCHA from Faizabad, at that time the capital of the Northern Alliance held area of Afghanistan.

Climate
Shahr-e Bozorg has a humid continental climate (Köppen Dsb).

See also
Badakhshan Province

References

External links 
Satellite map at Maplandia.com 

Populated places in Badakhshan Province